Veerankutty is a Malayalam poet and former Associate Professor in Dept of Malayalam Govt College Madappally. He was born in Narayamkulam near Perambra in Kozhikode District, Kerala, India. Veerankutty worked as Head of Malayalam Department at MEASS College Areacode.

His poems were translated to English, German, Tamil, Kannada, Marathi and Hindi languages. The English translation was by Mr Sachidananthan, Dr. K.M Shareef and Prof. Zahira Rahman and was published in Indian Literature, Poetry International web magazine and Malayalam Literary survey. His poems are included in Kannur University, Kerala University Calicut University and Mahatma Gandhi University Text Books. His poems were also included in 3rd and 8th Std Malayalam text Books prepared by SCRT Govt.of Kerala. A German translation of his poem is in Swiss Radio.

Awards
Veerankutty was awarded the K. S. K Thalikkulam award for his poetry collection 'Jalabhoopadam' in 2001.  He also received various other awards like the S.B.T Award, Tamil Nadu C.T.M.A Sahithya PuraskaramCherusseri Sahithya Puraskaram, Abudabi Harithakshara Puraskaaram and V T Kumaran Kavya Puraskaram.  He also won Mahakavi P Kunjiraman Nair Kavitha Puraskaaram, and Ayanam A Ayyappan puraskaram in 2016 and Dubai Galleria Literary award in 2017 for his anthology 'Veerankuttiyute kavithakal'. His anthology, Mindaprani was selected for the 2017 Kerala Sahitya Akademi Award for Poetry.

Published worksAnthology of Poems Jhala Bhoopatam, Published by Pappiyon Kozhikode, 2001.
 Manthrikan, Published by DC Books, Kottayam, 2004.
 Autograph, Published by DC Books, Kottayam, 2007.
 Manveeru, Published by DC Books, Kottayam, 2011.
 Thottu Thottu Nadakkumbol(SMS poems), Published by Small Letters, Kozhikode, 2010.
 Veerankuttiyute kavithakal, published by DC Books, Kottayam, 2013
 Always in bloom(English)Sanbun Publishers Delhi 2013
 Mindaprani, Published by DC Books, Kottayam, 2015.
 A Stroll Grazing Each Other(English)With Ullas R Koya DC Books, Kottayam 2016
 Nissabdathayude Republic, published by DC Books, Kottayam, 2018
 The Heaviness Of The Rain (English translation by Ministhy S Nair)Nageen Prakasan, Meerut 2018Children's’ literature Undanum noolanum, Published by DC Books, Kottayam.
 Nalumanippoovu, Published by DC Books, Kottayam.
 Kunjan puli kunjan muyalaya katha by DC Books Kottayam.
 Parannu Parannu Chekkuttippaava DC Books Kottayam 2018Memoirs'
 Mazhathullikal vacha Ummakal, eye books kozhikode, 2017
 Prakruthi Pranayam Prathirodham- Interview-Eye Books Kozhikode 2017

References

External links 

Kozhikkode
Living people
Malayalam-language writers
Writers from Thiruvananthapuram
1962 births
Indian male poets